Hip Hop Gold Dust is a compilation album by American hip hop producer Prince Paul. The album consists mainly of unreleased Prince Paul tracks from various points in his career. It features songs from his time working with Stetsasonic, De La Soul, Gravediggaz, Resident Alien, and Biz Markie. The song, "Don't Be Afraid of the Dark" by Gravediggaz, only appears on promo copies of the album but was deleted from the track list on the official CD and LP release.

Track listing
 Soul Brothers – Soul Brothers Intro (unreleased)
 De La Soul – My Mindstate (Unreleased)
 Gravediggaz feat Craig Gee – Don't Be Afraid Of The Dark
 Resident Alien – Shakey Grounds (unreleased)feat Superstar of Horror City
 Bugg Out Piece – A Fine Day (Pt.1)
 Groove B Chill – Top Of The Hill
 Prince Paul – Sucker For Love
 Resident Alien – Alone (unreleased)
 Bugg Out Piece – A Fine Day (Pt.2)
 LA Symphony – Broken Now (unreleased)
 Prince Paul, Chubb Rock & Biz Markie – No Rubber No Backstage Pass
 May May – Real Man (unreleased)
 Justin Warfield – K Sera Sera
 Gravediggaz – Constant Elevation (unreleased vocal version)
 Sha Of Horror City – Big Sha (unreleased)
 The Monolith (unreleased)
 Gravediggaz – Suicide (remix) 
 Stetsasonic – Stet Live WNYU (unreleased)
 Prince Paul – Prince Paul vs The World
 Bugg Out Piece – A Fine Day (conclusion) 

2005 compilation albums
Prince Paul (producer) albums
Albums produced by Prince Paul (producer)